Cattleya dormaniana, or Dorman's cattleya, is a bifoliate Cattleya species of orchid.  The diploid chromosome number of C. dormaniana has been determined as 2n = 40.

References

External links

dormaniana
dormaniana